Yuanxi may refer to:

Places in China
Yuanxi Subdistrict (源西街道), a subdistrict of Yuancheng District, Heyuan, Guangdong
Yuanxi, Sichuan (鸳溪), a town in Cangxi County, Sichuan

Historical eras
Yuanxi (元熙, 304–308), era name used by Liu Yuan (Han Zhao), emperor of Han Zhao (Former Zhao)
Yuanxi (元璽, 352–357), era name used by Murong Jun, emperor of Former Yan
Yuanxi (元熙, 419–420), era name used by Emperor Gong of Jin

See also
Yuan Xi (died 207), the second son of the warlord Yuan Shao